Oscar Robert "Bo" Briggery (August 8, 1908 – September 12, 1971) was an American baseball shortstop in the Negro leagues. He played with the Atlanta Black Crackers in 1932.

References

External links
 and Seamheads

Atlanta Black Crackers players
1908 births
1971 deaths
People from Walton County, Georgia
Baseball players from Georgia (U.S. state)
Baseball shortstops
20th-century African-American sportspeople